Rockcliff may refer to:

Sir Walter Rockcliff Farquhar, former owner of Polesden Lacey
Isodendrion laurifolium, plant species commonly known as rockcliff isodendrion
Rockliff, a boat which was wrecked in 1836
Whitley Bay Rockcliff RFC, English rugby union team

See also

Rockcliffe
Rockliff
Rockliffe